The Internacia Junulara Festivalo (IJF) is a traditional one-week-long meeting of Esperantists organised yearly by the Italian Esperanto Youth at Easter, each time in a different Italian town. Each festival has its own theme, to be developed in lectures and discussion groups; additionally, lectures of general interest are usually proposed, as well as tourist visits to neighbouring cities, concerts and performances. One can usually improve his/her knowledge of the Esperanto language thanks to language courses at beginner and intermediate level.

The first IJF was held in 1977. The meeting is usually attended by about 100 participants; the most popular one was the 24th IJF, held in 2000, which was attended by 325 participants.

Chronology

Other Esperanto meetings 
Internacia Junulara Kongreso
Internacia Junulara Semajno
Internacia Seminario
Ago-Semajno
Internacia Festivalo

External links 
 The official webpage of IJF (in Italian and Esperanto)

Esperanto meetings